Ypthima baldus, the common five-ring, is a species of Satyrinae butterfly found in Asia.

Description

Wet-season form (in India)
Male: Upperside brown, both forewing and hindwing with terminal margins much darker, and generally with more or less distinct subbasal and discal dark bands. Forewing with a large, slightly oblique, oval, bi-pupilled, yellow-ringed black, pre-apical ocellus. Hindwing with two postdiscal, round, uni-pupilled, similar but smaller ocelli, and very often one or two minute tornal ocelli also.

Underside similar to the underside in Y. philomela but the ochraceous-white ground colour paler, tin-transverse brown strice coarser, the ocelli on the hindwing more distinctly in echelon, two tornal, two median, and two preapical, and on both forewing and hindwing more or less distinctly defined, subbasal, discal and subterminal brown transverse bands.

Female: Differs on the upperside in having the area surrounding or bordering the ocelli on both forewing and hindwing paler, closely irrorated (sprinkled) with brown striae, the discal transverse band generally clearly defined, and very often both the tornal, and at least one of the apical, ocelli distinct. On the underside it is paler than the male, and has the subbasal, discal and subterminal transverse dark bands more clearly defined.

Dry-season form (in India)
Males and females: Upperside very similar to the above, paler; in the female often the ground colour ochraceous white, closely irrorated with brown striae; ocelli as in the wet-season form, but those on the hindwing often non-pupilled. Underside also paler than in the wet-season form, the subbasal, discal and subterminal bands on the whole more prominent; ocelli on the hindwing reduced to mere specks.

Wingspan of 38–46 mm.

Distribution
Bangladesh, Bhutan, China (mainland and Hong Kong), India (sub-Himalayan areas from Chamba to Sikkim; central India and the hills of southern India and the Western Ghats, Assam), Indonesia (Borneo), Japan, Korean Peninsula, Malay Peninsula, Cambodia, Myanmar, Pakistan, Russia (Kuril Islands), Singapore, Taiwan, Thailand and Vietnam (north part).

Subspecies

The species may be divided into the following subspecies:
 Ypthima baldus baldus (India to Indochina, Burma, Thailand, Cambodia and southern Yunnan)
 Ypthima baldus hyampeia Fruhstorfer, 1911 (southern Ussuri and Korea)
 Ypthima baldus jezoensis Matsumura, 1919 (Kuriles)
 Ypthima baldus luoi Huang, 1999 (Yunnan)
 Ypthima baldus marshalli Butler, 1882
 Ypthima baldus moerus Fruhstorfer, 1911
 Ypthima baldus newboldi Distant, 1882 (Peninsular Malaya, Langkawi, and Singapore)
 Ypthima baldus okurai Okano, 1962 (Taiwan)
 Ypthima baldus pasitelides Fruhstorfer, 1911 (Bawean)
 Ypthima baldus selinuntius Fruhstorfer, 1911 (Borneo and Natuna Islands)
 Ypthima baldus zodina Fruhstorfer, 1911 (Taiwan)

See also
 List of butterflies of Bangladesh
 List of butterflies of China (Nymphalidae)
 List of butterflies of India
 List of butterflies of Japan
 List of butterflies of the Korean Peninsula
 List of butterflies of Pakistan
 List of butterflies of Peninsular Malaysia
 List of butterflies of Singapore
 List of butterflies of Taiwan

References

External links

 UniProt
 Agriculture, Fisheries, and Conservation Department, The Government of Hong Kong Special Administrative Region
 Fruit-feeding butterflies recorded by traps

baldus
Butterflies of Asia
Butterflies of Indochina
Butterflies of Singapore
Butterflies of Borneo
Butterflies described in 1775
Taxa named by Johan Christian Fabricius